Stan Munro is a female impersonator, drag performer and comedian born 1941 in Wales.. He has been performing since he was 13 years old touring with The Francis Langford Boys Choir.

In 1963, Stan joined the long-running internationally renowned cabaret show Les Girls in Kings Cross, Sydney as one of the original cast members alongside Carlotta. While performing with Les Girls, Stan spoke Polari, popularising it with the other performers.

In 1970, when the Les Girls arrived in Melbourne, Stan led the troupe and was the compère, performing for seven years. Stan was the first female impersonator to perform at Pentridge Prison.

Outside of Australia, Stan has performed across Asia, Europe and the United Kingdom

In 1973, Stan appeared on the Graham Kennedy Show interviewed by Bert Newton following a performance by the Les Girls cast. Stan has also starred in the 1970 Jeff Bridges film Yin and Yang of Mr Go, and Alvin Purple where he was the first female impersonator to be featured in Australian film.

References 

Drag performers
Welsh comedians

Year of birth missing (living people)
Living people